Hendrik Jacob Hamaker (16 September 1844 in Hilversum – 2 March 1911 in Utrecht) was a Dutch jurist and scholar.

After studies at Leiden University, he practiced law there. Beginning in 1877, he taught civil law at the University of Utrecht, and after 1895 co-edited a leading journal of civil law, Weekblad voor Privaatrecht, Notarisambt en Registratie. He is noted for his work on judicial methodology, arguing for a substantial independence of judges from positive law.

Hamaker was elected a member of the Royal Netherlands Academy of Arts and Sciences in 1889.

References

 

1844 births
1911 deaths
19th-century Dutch jurists
20th-century Dutch jurists
Leiden University alumni
Members of the Royal Netherlands Academy of Arts and Sciences
People from Hilversum
Academic staff of Utrecht University